The 1987 National Challenge Cup, now called the Lamar Hunt U.S. Open Cup, is a single-elimination tournament in American soccer. The tournament is the oldest ongoing national soccer competition in the U.S. and is currently open to all United States Soccer Federation affiliated teams, from amateur adult club teams to the professional clubs of Major League Soccer.

Bracket

Results 
The Results are given below

National Semifinals 
(St. Louis Soccer Park – Fenton, Mo.) 
June 20	Club España (DC/VA)	3:0	Dallas Mean Green (North TX)
June 20	Seattle Mitre Eagles (WA)	5:4 (AET)	St. Louis Busch SC (MO)

Final 
June 21	Club España (DC/VA)	0:0 (3:2 PKs)	Seattle Mitre Eagles (WA)

References
 

Cup
U.S. Open Cup